Hans Westerhof (born 24 November 1948) is a Dutch football coach and currently supervisory board member at SC Heerenveen. Besides the Netherlands, he has coached in the United States and Mexico.

As a player, Westerhof played for BV Veendam and BVO Cambuur of the Dutch First Division. He began his coaching career in 1982, and has managed ONS Sneek, ACV, Groningen (1988–92 and 1994–96), PSV Eindhoven (1992–1994), the Dutch U-21 national team (1996–97), Ajax Amsterdam (2000),  Willem II Tilburg (2000–03) and Chivas de Guadalajara (2003–04), Necaxa (2007–2008)

Westerhof originally joined Chivas de Guadalajara in 2003 as sporting director of the club's teams, but took over the dual role as head coach of the first team in October of that year. He stepped down as coach after the Clausura 2004 season. On 3 June 2005, while serving as sporting director, Guadalajara's "sister" team, Chivas USA, named Westerhof its head coach, after a disastrous start under Thomas Rongen. He was replaced after the season by Bob Bradley and then came back to the parent club as its head coach and sporting director.

Besides coaching, he has been a teacher in Heerenveen (the Netherlands) at the Central Institute for Sports Education (CIOS) for many years. For Apertura 2007, Westerhof was appointed New Head Coach of Necaxa of Mexico.

On 12 June 2008, Hans was appointed Vitesse Arnhem new coach. He was then sacked after six months in December after a disappointing first half of the season. Having led them into 15th position of the 18-team league, he managed 15 points from 17 matches.

References

1948 births
Living people
People from Oude IJsselstreek
Association football midfielders
Dutch footballers
SC Veendam players
SC Cambuur players
Dutch football managers
FC Groningen managers
PSV Eindhoven managers
AFC Ajax managers
Willem II (football club) managers
Chivas USA coaches
Club Necaxa managers
SBV Vitesse managers
Dutch expatriate sportspeople in the United States
Dutch expatriate football managers
Expatriate football managers in Mexico
Expatriate soccer managers in the United States
C.D. Guadalajara managers
Major League Soccer coaches
Dutch expatriate sportspeople in Mexico
Asser Christelijke Voetbalvereniging managers
Footballers from Gelderland